MillenniumIT ESP is a Sri Lanka-based information technology firm that specialises in electronic trading systems, and capital market technology solutions, and is headquartered in Colombo, Sri Lanka. It has been a fully owned technology business sector of London Stock Exchange Group since 2009. It rebranded in 2017 as LSEG Technology.

MillenniumIT's systems are used by exchange businesses around the world including, London Stock Exchange, Borsa Italiana, Turquoise, the London Metal Exchange, Johannesburg Stock Exchange and a series of emerging market exchanges.

History 
The company was founded in 1996 by Tony Weerasinghe as a systems integrator and Sun Microsystems authorized reseller. MillenniumIT entered the software design field the following year when it interpreted a systems integration contract from the Colombo Stock Exchange (CSE) as an opportunity to design and install a straight-through processing system for the Exchange. The CSE solution became the basis for MillenniumIT's suite of capital-markets software products. In the year 2000 MillenniumIT became Sun Microsystems' regional distributor for Bangladesh, Nepal and Maldives. Its capital-markets software found a number of customers around the world, and in 2001 MillenniumIT won its first major US contract and set up operations in Boston, MA.

In 2002, the firm moved into its new corporate headquarters, the first Silicon Valley style software campus in Sri Lanka. The company was awarded contracts in Boston and Nairobi.  It also continued to expand by opening a UK subsidiary and office in 2004. The following year, the company was contracted to provide an automated equity, ETF and options-trading system for the American Stock Exchange (AMEX).

Live trading at AMEX commenced in 2006, even as the company received a US patent on its Business Innovation Dynamically (BID) technology. At home in Sri Lanka, MillenniumIT commenced implementation of a countrywide intranet for the national fixed-line telecoms provider, SLT, while US operations expanded with a new office in Jersey City, NJ.

London Stock Exchange Group acquisition 
Following a contract with London Stock Exchange (part of London Stock Exchange Group - LSEG) for a new trading platform for equities, MillenniumIT was acquired by LSEG in 2009. The acquisition gave the company a footing in international competition, and a number of orders from around the world followed shortly.

In 2010, LSEG's Turquoise trading platform was successfully migrated to Millennium Exchange, MillenniumIT's flagship capital-markets software. The company was now active on four continents, and important business wins continued in Canada, India and South Africa. It also entered into a partnership agreement with Tullett Prebon to further develop the IDB's electronic broking capabilities across a variety of asset classes for internal and external trading systems. In May 2013, Mack Gill became CEO and in June 2014, founder Tony Weeresinghe resigned from the company as Chairman.

In 2017, Lanka Century Investments PLC bought the company from the London Stock Exchange Group for LKR1079.1 million.

References

Software companies of Sri Lanka
Financial software companies
London Stock Exchange
2009 mergers and acquisitions
Rebrand